The 1997 World Jiu-Jitsu Championship, also known as II BJJ Mundials, was an international jiu-jitsu event organised by the International Brazilian Jiu-Jitsu Federation (IBJFF) and held at the Tijuca Tênis Clube in Rio de Janeiro, Brazil on 1 April 1997.

Teams results 
Results by Academy

Notes

References 

World Jiu-Jitsu Championship